Nipponidion is a genus of Japanese comb-footed spiders that was first described by H. Yoshida in 2001.  it contains two species, found in Japan: N. okinawense and N. yaeyamense.

See also
 List of Theridiidae species

References

Araneomorphae genera
Spiders of Asia
Theridiidae